Happy Together is a 1999 South Korean television series starring Lee Byung-hun, Song Seung-heon, Kim Ha-neul, Jo Min-su, Jun Ji-hyun, Kang Sung-yeon, Cha Tae-hyun, and Cho Jae-hyun  It aired on SBS from June 16 to August 5, 1999 on Wednesdays and Thursdays at 21:55 for 16 episodes. Starring young actors who would go on to become Korean TV and film stars, the hit drama revolves around five children who were separated at the death of their parents, and the love, conflicts, and reconciliation that these siblings go through when they meet again as adults.

Plot 
After the tragic death of their parents, the lives of five siblings are irrevocably changed when they are separated. Now grown up, Seo Tae-poong (Lee Byung-hun) is a professional baseball player. Longing to bring his family back together, the kind-hearted Tae-poong has been searching his whole life for his brother and three sisters.

Tae-poong's older sister Seo Chan-joo (Jo Min-su) has been supporting her younger siblings Moon-joo (Kang Sung-yeon), and Ji-suk (Song Seung-heon), who is newly engaged to his girlfriend Jin Soo-ha (Kim Ha-neul). When Tae-poong finds Chan-joo, Ji-suk and Moon-joo, his estranged siblings want nothing to do with him. Reeling from their coldness, Tae-poong must also deal with an eight-year-old boy who claims to be his son. Not knowing what to do, Tae-poong turns to Chan-joo for help. Meanwhile, youngest sister of the family Seo Yoon-joo (Jun Ji-hyun) has found her big brother Tae-poong after detachment of 10 years but his brother couldn't recognise her. So not revealing her actual identity heartbroken Seo Yoon-joo starts helping her brother. A thug, Ha Shin-yeob (Cha Tae-hyun) and Jo Pil-doo (Cho Jae-hyun) starts showing his affectionate love towards Yoon-joo by making frequent visit at her workplace.

Cast 
 Lee Byung-hun as Seo Tae-poong 
 Song Seung-heon as Seo Ji-suk 
 Kim Ha-neul as Jin Soo-ha 
 Jo Min-su as Seo Chan-joo 
 Jun Ji-hyun as Seo Yoon-joo 
 Kang Sung-yeon as Seo Moon-joo
 Cha Tae-hyun as Ha Shin-yeob
 Cho Jae-hyun as Jo Pil-doo
 Han Go-eun as Chae-rim
 Seo Beom-shik
 Jo Yeon-hee as Joo Hee-ju	
 Oh Mi-yeon
 Son Hyun-joo
 Shim Yang-hong
 Park In-hwan as Soo-ha's father

References

External links 
 
 

Seoul Broadcasting System television dramas
1999 South Korean television series debuts
1999 South Korean television series endings
Korean-language television shows
1990s South Korean television series
South Korean romance television series